(or ) was a supernatural person in Māori mythology.

One day Apakura threw her apron into the sea, and a sea  named Rongotakawhiu took it and worked it into human form, and Whakatau was born. The  taught him the arts of enchantment. As the child grew older, people saw kites flying at sea, but could not see who held the strings. Whakatau loved to fly kites, and would run along the floor of the ocean with his toy. One day, he came ashore and the people tried to catch him. Whakatau was too fast a runner and would let no one catch him except his mother Apakura. He then lived on land with her, and grew up into a famous hero.

In another account, Tūwhakararo was murdered by the men of the Ati Hapai tribe, and Whakatau set out on a quest to rescue the bones of his father, and to avenge his death. The expedition set off, and Whakatau, with his best men, besieged a  called  where the enemy were gathered. The house was burned and the people of Ati Hapai were wiped out.

In some accounts, Whakatau was a son of Tūhuruhuru (son of Hinauri), and a nephew of Tūwhakararo.

References 

Legendary Māori people